Alastorynerus is a genus of potter wasps.

References

Potter wasps
Hymenoptera genera